The Badin District is a district in the Sindh province of Pakistan. The total area of the district is 6,726 square kilometers. Headquartered at the city of Badin, the district is situated between 24°-5` to 25°-25` north latitude and 68 21’ to 69 20’ east longitude and is bounded on the north by the Tando Allahyar District, Northwest by Hyderabad District, on the east by Mirpur Khas and Tharparkar districts, on the south by the Kutch district of India,  and on the west by Sujawal and Tando Muhammad Khan District.

History
Badin was one of the centers of the center of the ancient Indus Valley civilization. The areas remained under the control of the Islamic caliphate until it came under control of the Ghaznavids. In 1592, Sindh came under the direct rule of the Mughal emperors.

Demographics
At the time of the 2017 census, Badin district had a population of 1,804,958, of which 931,177 were males and 873,589 females. The rural population was 1,414,614 (78.37%) and urban 390,344 (21.63%). The literacy rate is 33.65%: 43.80% for males and 22.84% for females.

Religion

The majority religion is Islam, with 76.11% of the population. Hinduism (including those from Scheduled Castes) is practiced by 23.61% of the population.

Language

At the time of the 2017 census, 94.12% of the population spoke Sindhi and 3.45% Punjabi as their first language.

Administration

List of Tehsils

The district is administratively subdivided into the following tehsil:

 Badin Tehsil
 Matli Tehsil
 Talhar Tehsil
 Tando Bago Tehsil
 Golarchi Tehsil

With the introduction of the devolution system, the talukas have been subdivided into the Union Councils numbering 49, Tapas 109 and Dehs 511.

List of Union Councils
Badin District includes the following Union Councils:

In 2013, the number of union councils in the district was increased to 68.

List of Dehs
The following is a list of Badin District's 511 dehs, organised by taluka:

Badin Taluka (142 dehs)
 Abri
 Achh
 Achhro
 Akro
 Aminariro
 Andhalo
 Angri
 Babralo-under sea
 Badin
 Baghar
 Bagreji
 Bakho Khudi
 Bandho
 Bano
 Behdmi
 Bhambhki
 Bhaneri
 Bidhadi
 Bijoriro
 Bokhi
 Booharki
 Borandi
 Buxa
 Chandhadi
 Chanesri
 Charo
 Cheerandi
 Chhel
 Chobandi
 Chorhadi
 Chorhalo
 Daleji
 Dandhi
 Daphri
 Dasti
 Dhandh
 Dharan
 Dheenghar
 Doonghadi
 Gabarlo
 Gad
 Gagro
 Ghurbi
 Githo
 Gujjo
 Gurho
 Jakhralo
 Jakhri
 Janath
 Janjhli
 Janki
 Jhagri
 Jhalar
 Jhol khasi
 Jhurkandi
 Kadhan
 Kadi kazia
 Kahlifa
 Kak
 Kalhori
 Kamaro
 Kand
 Kandri
 Karabhari
 Keerandi
 Khakhar
 Khalso
 Khambro
 Kheerdahi
 Khudi
 Khurhadi
 Khuro
 Kumbhairo
 Kunar
 Lohan
 Lao
 Lareri
 Loon Khan
 Luari Sharif
 Lundo
 Majja Basri
 Makhandi
 Makra
 Malki
 Marai
 Mard
 Markhan
 Mirzapur
 Mithi
 Mithi-2
 Mithi-3
 More
 Moreri
 Morhadi
 Moro
 Nangarkhet
 Nangro
 Nareri
 Nindo Shaher
 Odha
 Ojhri
 Padhar
 Pado
 Pahori
 Pakhothar
 Palh
 Panchi
 Panhwarki
 Pano
 Pano Baeed
 Pano Baqir
 Pano Lundki
 Pano Mir Khan
 Patar
 Pateji
 Patiari
 Qaimpur
 Rat
 Roonghadi
 Sando
 Sanghar
 Sanjra
 Sarahadi
 Saroro
 Seerani
 Setha
 Sheikhpur
 Sialki
 Siantri
 Siarsi
 Singari
 Sonhar
 Sutiari
 Tali
 Thath
 Vidhri
 Wagodaho
 Wahryaro
 Waryaso
 Matli Taluka (98 dehs)
 Aghamano
 Ali pur
 Amarlo
 Arain
 Bambhnai
 Baran
 Barasar
 Bediro
 Bhadari
 Buhro Jagir
 Buhro Rayati
 Chakra
 Chan Ganga
 Chansonrani
 Chan-sorahadi
 Chaogazo
 Choretani
 Dasti
 Dadhar
 Dakaro
 Dariri
 Daro sendi
 Deero muhabat
 Dembyari
 Dhabhi
 Dilo-dero
 Diyal
 Doomani
 Dumbalo
 Gari Bhri
 Ghari Lundi
 Gharo
 Gharo Sarmast
 Gopalo
 Gorano
 Gujo
 H. Karam Ali
 Hanjar
 Jarki
 Jehajani
 Juneja
 Kalwari
 Kandrahki
 Kangni
 Kanheri
 Kari Muhammad Ali
 Kari sain Dad
 Kariyano
 Kathore
 Keenjhar
 Khaberlo
 Khachar
 Khad Khuhi
 Khairwah
 Khareri
 Khari, Sindh
 Khariyon
 Khathore
 Khori
 Khudi
 Labni
 Lakhadi
 Lanyari
 Lorer
 Lundano
 Maban
 Malhan
 Mangria
 Matli
 More
 Morhadi
 Nathu
 Pabni
 Padhar
 Paee
 Paniro
 Panjm Hisso
 Phulejani
 Rain
 Rohiro
 Sando
 Saonro
 Sehrat
 Senhor
 Sikni
 Sita
 Sore
 Sorhadi
 Sun
 T.G Ali`
 Talho
 Talhyari
 Tali
 Thari
 Udhejani
 Vee
 Waghrayi
 Wanji
 Shaheed Fazil Rahu Taluka (97 dehs)
 Agri
 Ahmed rajo-1
 Ahmed rajo-2
 Ahmed rajo-3
 Ahmed rajo-4
 Ahmed rajo-5
 Ahmed rajo-6
 Akai
 Akri Jagir
 Akri-1
 Akri-2
 Aseli
 Bari
 Barodari
 Bukerani
 Cahkari
 Chachh
 Dadharko
 Dandho
 Dasarki
 Dubi
 Fatehpur
 Ghanwarah
 Gharo
 Girhari-1
 Girhari-2
 Girhari-3
 Girhari-4
 Girhari-5
 Githo
 Golarchi
 Gujhari
 Jakheji 1 & 2
 Jhabiro
 Jhol
 Jhol-2
 Jhole-1
 Jhole-2
 Jhole-3
 Jhole-4
 Jhole-5
 Jhole-6
 Kadh
 Kaheki
 Kakejani
 Kand
 Kandeyari
 Kario 1 & 2
 Khathar
 Kharch
 Khareyoon
 kharoDabo
 Khebrani
 Kheeryoon
 Khero Bhataro
 Khersari
 Khorwah
 Khudh
 Kinder Jageer
 Koryani
 Lakhi
 Lakri
 Lashkarnani
 Lorhad
 Malira
 Mariwasayo-1
 Mariwasayo-2
 Maroo jat
 Minyoon
 Mitho Dabo
 Miyano Karrath
 Mukhdoompur
 Mulki
 Narri
 Narbut
 Nohiki
 Nukarji-1
 Nuqarji-2
 Odherki
 Padheryoon
 Patihal
 Phitoon
 Rahuki
 Rari-1
 Rari-2
 Rari-3
 Rari-4
 Rari-5
 Rip
 Saleh abad
 Samki
 Shekhano
 Sodhki
 Sorhadi
 Suteyari
 Tajhedi
 Tarai
 Walhar
 Talher Taluka (55 dehs)
 Bagerki
 Baghlani
 Bhetaro
 Bohrro I
 Bohrro II
 Bohrro III
 Bohrro IV
 Chachari
 Chanri
 Chick
 Dabgro
 Dabhrro
 Dato Jamali
 Daurung
 Dedki
 Doro Nero
 Dourmano
 Gaheki
 Golarri
 Gonho
 Kanderi
 Khanoat
 Kocho Sajan Sawai
 Kohar
 Koteri
 Lundki
 More
 Morjhar
 Mughal Hafiz
 Munahaiki
 Nar
 Nawabed
 Paathroon
 Perharki
 Phosana
 Phulhadion
 Raheji
 Rembhan
 Rip
 Rojherlei
 Saidpur
 Sajan
 Sajan pur
 Sandhki
 Sausi
 Seri
 Shakani
 Shorki
 Talhar
 Vassarki
 Vidh
 Vidh
 Walhar
 Wasi Adil
 Wasi Sajjan
 Tando Bago Taluka (110 dehs)
 Adori
 Ahmedani
 Akore
 Ali abad
 Amar Nar
 Aqil
 Bagh Shahmir
 Banghar
 Baxo Kaloi
 Beero Weran
 Belaro
 Bhryoon
 Bohri
 Chandheli-1
 Chandheli-11
 Chandheli-111
 Changho
 Char
 Charvo
 Chavra
 Chhabralo
 Chhachh
 Chhan
 Choubandi
 Dadah
 Dambharlo
 Dando
 Dei
 Dei jarkas
 Dhanjol
 Dhoro Kaka Noro
 Dhubni
 Digh
 Domhar
 Duz
 Fateh Pur
 Fato Qambrani
 Gad
 Gaheji
 Girathri
 Gujo
 Hajar Hadi
 Hameera
 Har
 Higorjani
 Hothair
 Jal Mori
 Jesar
 Kahdharo
 Kak-1
 Kak-11
 Kak-111
 Kamaro
 Kang
 Kangpir
 Kapoori
 Kariyano
 Katadaho
 Katal
 Khadi Adat
 Khado
 Khahi Beero
 Khairpur
 Khalso
 Khanah
 Khari Khabarlo
 Kheerdahi
 Kherol
 Khoro
 Khoski
 Khureri
 Korahi
 Liar
 Machandi
 Machori
 Mato
 Mena
 Mesadi
 Mohna
 Morahadi
 Moro
 Motna
 Oil Pur
 Panu Nau
 Pharho
 Phull
 Phyari
 Pir Misri
 Piror
 Potho
 Potho Nar
 Rail Tarai
 Rajori-1
 Rajori-111
 Ropari
 Saddiq
 Sangi
 Senhaho
 Sonhar
 Sonhari
 Tando Bago
 Tayab Sehto
 Thorki
 Thorlo
 Thui
 Tori
 Toryano
 Uanrki
 Vee Bahadur
 Waghdahi

Education
The University of Sindh offers 4- year (8- Semester) bachelor's degree programs in Business Administration, Commerce and Computer Science, PGD. Computer Science and B.Ed., M.Ed. & M.A. (Education).

Economy
Nearly 83% of the population lives in the rural areas with farming as the main source of livelihood. The district is irrigated by Indus River through the Akram Wah, Phuleli and Guni Canals of Kotri Barrage and Nasir Canal of Sukkur Barrage. Main Crops are Sugar Cane, Rice, Tomato, Wheat and Sunflower. There are six Sugar Mills and 30 Rice Husking mills in the District. The Oil fields in the Badin district produces nearly 50% of total production of crude oil of Pakistan.

Railways
The main line runs from Badin to Hyderabad through the Matli taluka.

Badin Coal Field
Spread at the area of 1,110sq.km, 'Badin Coal Field' reserves around 1.358 billion metric tons of coal.

Villages per bux mugheri 

Kario Ghanwer

See also
 Districts of Pakistan
 Districts of Sindh

References

External links

 
Sindh